Joshua Claybourn is an American attorney, author, and historian considered one of the foremost living scholars on Abraham Lincoln’s youth in Indiana.

Career

Legal work
Claybourn is an attorney with the law firm of Jackson Kelly representing governmental entities and officials, as well as businesses and corporations. Citing Article 1, Section 2 of the United States Constitution, Claybourn appeared before the Indiana Election Commission and successfully challenged a 23-year-old person's legal right to appear on the ballot as a candidate for Congress in Indiana's 8th congressional district. Together with Abby DeMare, he argued in the Indiana Law Review for greater checks and balances on executive branch emergency powers. Claybourn served as co-counsel in a civil suit against the State of Indiana and Indiana Governor Eric Holcomb, alleging that Governor Holcomb exceeded his authority under the Constitution of Indiana when he issued certain executive orders in connection with the COVID-19 pandemic. Citing Governor Holcomb's rescission of the subject executive orders, the trial court dismissed the complaint as moot and the Indiana Court of Appeals affirmed.

Historian and pundit
Claybourn is considered one of the foremost living scholars on President Lincoln’s youth in Indiana. He appeared as an expert in the six-part CNN documentary Lincoln: Divided We Stand. Claybourn is editor of Abraham Lincoln's Wilderness Years, a compilation of significant scholarship from J. Edward Murr covering Lincoln's youth. He is co-editor (with William Bartelt) of Abe’s Youth: Shaping the Future President, providing source material from the Indiana Lincoln Inquiry. Claybourn also served as a research assistant to Professor Gerard Magliocca during his work on Andrew Jackson and the Constitution: The Rise and Fall of Generational Regimes.

Claybourn edited Our American Story: The Search for a Shared National Narrative (Potomac Books, 2019), a collection of essays by theorists, historians, and politicians addressing the possibility of a shared narrative within a country divided by political polarization. Contributors to the project include Cass Sunstein, Gordon S. Wood, John Danforth, Richard Epstein, David Blight, Markos Moulitsas, Alan Taylor, Eleanor Clift, Jim Banks, Nikolas Gvosdev, Ilya Somin, Cherie Harder, Gerard Magliocca, Jason Kuznicki, Cody Delistraty, Spencer Boyer, Ali Wyne, and James Wertsch. Kirkus Reviews wrote that the book's "responses are all over the map, provocatively so" and called it a "mixed-bag collection".

Politics
Claybourn, named one of the 250 most influential leaders in Indiana, often serves as a political advisor.

In 2016, Claybourn was selected as an Indiana delegate to the 2016 Republican National Convention, but a day after Donald Trump's win in the Indiana primary which made Trump the party's presumptive nominee, Claybourn was one of the first to resign his position as a delegate because he "could not in good conscience attend a coronation and celebration of Donald Trump". The New York Times noted Claybourn would have been bound to vote for Trump on the first ballot, "a step he said he simply could not stomach". In a statement Claybourn said, "Donald J. Trump is the Republican Party's nominee. But he will not be my nominee, and I will not attend a convention celebrating his candidacy."

Publications
 Claybourn, Joshua A., ed. Abraham Lincoln's Wilderness Years: Collected Works of J. Edward Murr. Bloomington: Indiana University Press, 2023.
 Claybourn, Joshua A., ed. Our American Story: The Search for a Shared National Narrative. Lincoln: Potomac Books, 2019.
 Bartelt, William, and Joshua A. Claybourn, eds. Abe’s Youth: Shaping the Future President. Bloomington: Indiana University Press, 2019.
 Claybourn, Joshua A., ed. Born of Clay: The Story of the Claiborne · Claybourn · Clayborn Families in the United States. Evansville: Claybourn Genealogical Society, 2016.

References

External links
 Personal home page

Living people
American male bloggers
American bloggers
American lawyers
American political commentators
Indiana Republicans
Politicians from Evansville, Indiana
Never Trump movement
1981 births
Historians of Abraham Lincoln
Historians from Indiana
American male biographers